Gheorghe Martin Tudor (10 June 1976 – 30 March 2020) was a Romanian footballer who played as a goalkeeper. Tudor was known as one of the best goalkeepers of Steaua București in the 2000s.

Martin Tudor signed his first professional contract with Jiul Petroșani in 1996, aged 20. From there he was transferred to Olimpia Satu Mare in 1997 and then to Steaua București two years later.

Tudor played for six years at Steaua București, but in 2005 left the club to join CFR 1907 Cluj. From 2007 to 2008 he played at U Cluj. He retired in June 2008. In January 2010 he returned to professional football and retired again in the same year.

After retirement, he started a new career as a goalkeeping coach, working for Steaua București, FC U Craiova, Romania national football team, Ittihad FC or FC Voluntari, among others.

On 30 March 2020, around 10 o'clock in the morning, Martin Tudor suffered a heart attack in the kitchen of his girlfriend's apartment, in Reșița. According to his former teammate Dorinel Munteanu, CSM Reșița manager at that time, "the ambulance arrived very quickly, but unfortunately, nothing could be done, all the resuscitation maneuvers were done, but the tragedy could not be avoided." Martin Tudor was declared deceased in the same day, at just 43 years.

Honours
Olimpia Satu Mare
 Divizia B: 1997–98
Steaua București
 Divizia A: 2000–01, 2004–05

References

External links
 

1976 births
2020 deaths
People from Avrig
Romanian footballers
Association football goalkeepers
Liga I players
Liga II players
CSM Jiul Petroșani players
FC Olimpia Satu Mare players
FC Steaua București players
CFR Cluj players
FC Universitatea Cluj players
FC Steaua II București players
Romanian expatriate sportspeople in Saudi Arabia